Democratic backsliding, also known as autocratization, is the decline in democratic qualities of a political regime.

Former Eastern bloc

Czech Republic 
The coinciding tenure from 2017 to 2021 of ANO 2011 leader Andrej Babiš and his ally, President Miloš Zeman, has been described by analysts Sean Hanley and Milada Anna Vachudova as a period of democratic backsliding, albeit to a less drastic degree than Poland or Hungary. However, other academics such as Elisabeth Bakke and Nick Sitter have disputed this, describing it as "conceptual stretching" and claiming that "exceptional factors" that existed in Hungary and Poland are not applicable to the Czech Republic.

Georgia 
Georgia's governing party, Georgian Dream (GD), was accused of democratic backsliding in a 2019 report by the Carnegie Endowment for International Peace, for failing to approve more representative electoral reform proposals. U.S. Senators Jim Risch and Jeanne Shaheen accused Prime Minister Giorgi Gakharia of backsliding for not implementing the reforms. The electoral system was ultimately reformed ahead of the 2020 Georgian parliamentary election in a compromise between the Georgian government and the opposition.

Iulia-Sabina Joja of the Middle East Institute has disputed allegations of democratic backsliding against the Georgian government, stating that "Georgia has fared well over the last eight years and GD has stayed on the path of democratization and reform" and drawing attention to Georgian improvements on corruption perception and press freedom indices.

Hungary 

Since 2010, Hungary under Viktor Orbán and his right-wing Fidesz party has been described as a prominent example of democratic backsliding. As in Poland, political interference by the legislative and executive branches of government threatens the institutional independence of the judiciary. In 2012, the legislature abruptly lowered the age of retirement for judges from 70 to 62, forcing 57 experienced court leaders (including the President of the Supreme Court) to retire. After the Court of Justice of the European Union ruled that this decision violated EU laws relating to equality in the employment context, the government repealed the law and compensated the judges, but did not reinstate those forced to retire. The 2012 judiciary reform also centralized administration of the courts under the newly established National Judiciary Office, then headed by Tünde Handó (a lawyer married to a prominent member of Fidesz). Under Handó, the NJO also weakened the institutions of judicial self-governance, provoking what the European Association of Judges, Amnesty International, and the Hungarian Helsinki Committee describe as a "constitutional crisis" within the Hungarian judiciary. Hungarian judges interviewed by Amnesty International also expressed concerns about attacks on the judiciary and individual judges by politicians and in the media. The Hungarian government has dismissed criticism of its record on democracy issues.

According to the 2020 report of the V-Dem Institute at the University of Gothenburg, Hungary had by 2019 become the first-ever EU member state to become an authoritarian regime. On Freedom House's annual report, Hungary's democracy rating dropped for ten consecutive years. Its classification was downgraded from "democracy" to "transitional or hybrid regime" in 2020; Hungary was also the first EU member state to be labeled "partially free" (in 2019). The organization's 2020 report states that "Orbán's government in Hungary has similarly dropped any pretense of respecting democratic institutions". A 2018 article published in the Journal of Democracy also described Hungary as a hybrid regime. Recently Hungary also backslid in its view regarding LGBT rights in Hungary, creating a bill similar to the Section 28 bill.

In July 2021, leaked data acquired by the Pegasus Project suggested the Hungarian government may have used NSO Group's Pegasus spyware to target opposition journalists. Hungarian officials acknowledged that they had purchased the spyware, but noted that they had received permission from either the courts or the Ministry of Justice in every case it was used.

North Macedonia
Macedonian Prime Minister Nikola Gruevski's VMRO-DPMNE government, which was in power from 2006 to 2016, has been described as engaging in democratic backsliding. Following Gruevski's departure from office as part of the Pržino Agreement, he was prosecuted for the wiretapping of thousands of Macedonian officials, inciting his supporters to violence and election misconduct. He subsequently fled the country and was granted political asylum in Hungary.

Poland

In the Polish case, the European Commission stated in December 2017 that in the two preceding years, the Parliament of Poland had adopted "13 laws affecting the entire structure of the justice system in Poland" with the "common pattern [that] the executive and legislative branches [were] systematically enabled to politically interfere in the composition, powers, administration, and functioning of the judicial branch." In February 2020, Věra Jourová, Vice President of the European Commission for Values and Transparency, described the disciplining of judges in Poland as "no longer a targeted intervention against individual black sheep, similar to other EU member states, but a case of carpet bombing. ... This is no reform, it's destruction." In late September 2020, 38 European and other law professors called on the President of the European Commission to take action in Poland, stating:

Polish authorities continue to openly abuse, harass and intimidate judges and prosecutors who are seeking to defend the rule of law. In addition, Polish authorities continue to openly defy the authority of the Court of Justice by refusing to follow its judgments. ... judges who are attempting to apply EU law are being threatened and punished while those who flaunt violations of EU law are being rewarded. ... The rule of law in Poland is not merely being attacked. It is being destroyed in plain sight.

Romania

The Social Democratic Party (PSD) has been repeatedly accused of democratic backsliding while in power in Romania, initially during the tenure of Prime Minister Victor Ponta, who led the country during the 2012 Romanian constitutional crisis, when Ponta engaged in several unconstitutional actions in an attempt to impeach President Traian Băsescu. Ponta's conduct was criticized by the European Union and the United States.

Ponta was accused of restricting voting among the Romanian diaspora in the 2014 Romanian presidential election, during which Ponta was running as the PSD presidential candidate. Following the election, which Ponta lost, his close ally, Sebastian Ghiță, was indicted for offering illegal incentives to Moldovans with Romanian citizenship to vote for Ponta. Ghiță subsequently fled the country for Serbia, due to his good relationship with Serbian President Aleksandar Vučić. Ponta also left Romania for Serbia from 2016 to 2018, receiving Serbian citizenship and serving as an advisor to Vučic.

After facing a corruption investigation in 2015, Ponta initially refused to resign as Prime Minister of Romania, prompting the 2015 Romanian political crisis. After the 2015 Romanian protests, Ponta ultimately resigned in November 2015.

PSD leader Liviu Dragnea, who was accused of vote rigging during the 2012 Romanian presidential impeachment referendum, was ultimately convicted in 2015. He was later indicted for abuse of office in 2016, preventing him from running for Prime Minister.

In 2017, PSD Prime Minister Sorin Grindeanu's government passed new legislation decriminalising misconduct by officials, which was condemned by President Klaus Johannis as a "day of mourning for the rule of law" in Romania. The legislation led to the 2017 Romanian protests.

In 2019, Romania indicted Laura Codruța Kövesi, the former chief prosecutor of the National Anticorruption Directorate, who was running for European Chief Prosecutor at the time, leading EU authorities to condemn Romania for backsliding on the rule of law. Critics claimed that Romania's indictment of Kövesi was motivated by her indictment of numerous politicians, including Dragnea, on corruption charges. Ponta, who had then become an opponent of Dragnea and the Romanian government after leaving the PSD, criticized the decision and described the PSD as increasingly "Fidesz-like", referring to the Hungarian ruling party.

The European Commission and European Court of Justice Advocate-General have criticized Romania's 2020 judicial reforms, suggesting that they undermined the rule of law in the country. The PSD lost power after the 2020 Romanian legislative election, with the new government pledging to reverse the reforms to comply with the EU's Mechanism for Cooperation and Verification.

After 2020 and especially after the 2021 political crisis, some sources (such as Radio Free Europe) claimed that president Klaus Iohannis' leadership has become increasingly illiberal, authoritarian, kleptocratic and corrupt.

Russia

Under 22 years of Vladimir Putin's leadership, the Russian Federation has experienced major democratic backsliding. Putin became Acting President of Russia with the resignation of Boris Yeltsin in 1999, and then full President in the 2000 Russian presidential election, and he was able to use "public and elite dissatisfaction with the instability of the 1990s" to consolidate power in his hands, while overseeing a decade of economic growth. The centralization of power under Putin weakened power of the Federal Assembly, and led to a return to more autocratic rule seen during the Soviet Union. In the late 1990s during the presidency of Boris Yeltsin, Freedom House gave Russia a score of 4 for "freedom, civil liberties and political rights".

Following subsequent de-democratization, experts do not generally consider Russia to be a democracy, citing purges and jailing of the regime's political opponents, curtailed press freedom, and the lack of free and fair elections. An example of the jailing of the regime's political opponents came most recently after the 2021 Russian protests when Alexei Navalny was arrested and sent to a penal colony and since then his Anti-Corruption Foundation has been deemed an extremist organization. In 2021 more journalists and news outlets were declared foreign agents, with Russian TV channel Dozhd added to that list. The Freedom House then in 2021 gave Russia a score of 20/100 and described it as not free. After serving 17 years as president, Putin, in 2021, signed a law allowing him to run in two more elections, potentially keeping him in power until 2036 with the 2020 amendments to the Constitution of Russia, leaving little constraint on his power. Putin's 2012 "foreign agents law" targeted NGOs and furthered the crackdown on internal dissent.

Scholars differ in their perspectives on the significant post-1998 democratic backsliding in Russia under Putin. Some view Russia's 1990s-era trend toward European-style democratization as fundamentally an ephemeral aberration, with Russia's subsequent democratic backsliding representing a return to its "natural" historical course. The opposite perspective is that the democratic decline under Putin would be a relatively short-term episode in Russian history: "From this perspective, Russia after 1991 was back on the path to Europe after the seventy-year interruption represented by communism", and "that path was inevitably to be bumpy and subject to setbacks."

Serbia and Montenegro
Freedom House's annual Nations in Transit report in 2020 reported that, due to democratic backsliding, Serbia and Montenegro in the Balkans were no longer democracies (as they had been classified since 2003) but had instead become hybrid regimes (in the "gray zone" between "democracies and pure autocracies"). The reported cited "years of increasing state capture, abuse of power, and strongman tactics employed" by Serbian President Aleksandar Vučić and Montenegrin President Milo Đukanović. Shortly after that report was published, the opposition won the 2020 Montenegrin parliamentary election and Zdravko Krivokapić was appointed to the office of Prime Minister, marking the first time since independence that the opposition has controlled the country's government.

The 2018–2020 Serbian protests were in-part aimed at opposing "growing authoritarian rule" under Vučić. Most opposition parties subsequently boycotted the 2020 Serbian parliamentary election, with OSCE observers saying "the pervasive influence of the ruling parties gave them undue advantage".

Slovakia
The tenure of Vladimír Mečiar as Slovak Prime Minister and President in the 1990s after the dissolution of Czechoslovakia has been described by political scientists Elisabeth Bakke and Nick Sitter as a period of democratic backsliding, due to Mečiar's control over state media and centralisation of executive power.

Widespread protests in 2018 following the murder of Ján Kuciak have been described by some scholars as "helping to stave off democratic backsliding" by causing the resignation of Robert Fico, who served as Prime Minister from 2006 to 2010 and 2012 to 2018. However, Bakke and Sitter have disputed allegations of democratic backsliding against Fico, noting that Fico often emphasized "his commitment to pluralistic democracy", which contrasted with the Polish and Hungarian leadership during that time period and Slovakia under Mečiar.

Slovenia
Prime Minister Janez Janša was criticised by Žiga Faktor of the EUROPEUM Institute for European Policy for overseeing democratic backsliding in Slovenia. Faktor claimed that Janša had aligned Slovenia closely with Hungary, denied journalists access to information during the COVID-19 pandemic, and had expanded his Slovenian Democratic Party's influence over the country's media with Hungarian financial support.

Janša left office in June 2022, following his defeat in the 2022 Slovenian parliamentary election by the Freedom Movement leader Robert Golob, who entered politics to stop democratic backsliding in Slovenia.

Ukraine
Several Ukrainian governments have faced accusations of democratic backsliding.

Prior to the removal of President Viktor Yanukovych in the 2014 Ukrainian revolution, Ukraine was described by political scientist Eleanor Knott as experiencing democratic backsliding and "soft authoritarianism".

The Atlantic Council's Maxim Eristavi claimed in 2017 that "Ukrainian democracy is in danger" following President Petro Poroshenko's attempts to arrest his former ally and opposition figure Mikheil Saakashvili, and calls by Poroshenko's party for criminal investigations into another political opponent, Yulia Tymoshenko.

President Volodymyr Zelenskyy drew criticism for democratic backsliding from members of the U.S. House of Representatives following Zelenskyy's firing of a pro-reform cabinet and the resignation of former National Bank of Ukraine Governor Yakiv Smolii. Melinda Haring of the Atlantic Council has warned the Constitutional Court of Ukraine's removal of authority from National Agency for Prevention of Corruption could put the country on the "on the edge of a major constitutional crisis" and criticized Zelenskyy's attempts to reform the Ukrainian judiciary as "ineffectual".

Pre-WWII Europe

Roman Republic 
Historian Edward Watts lists the following causes as contributing to the devolution of the Roman Republic into an empire, on the theme of violating long-established norms of the republic:
 Abuse of political processes to personally punish opponents (by not approving a treaty) and obstructionist tactics that blocked reformed to deal with economic inequality, forcing proponents to use more aggressive political tactics.
 Soldiers becoming loyal to their commanders rather than the state, with their commanders seeking personal gains.
 Resorting to violence rather than political processes to solve disputes. The first political assassinations in centuries led to armed factions influencing votes and elections, and to mob violence and civil war.
 Complacency among people who found it difficult to imagine that a centuries-old republic could fail.
 Ability of Augustus, the first emperor, to prevent control of Rome by foreigners and corrupt politicians, and to prevent civil war through personal dominance.

Watts points out one of the main features of a functioning republican system is that loss of an election does not result in imprisonment or execution.

Weimar Republic 

The causes of the devolution of the Weimar Republic into Nazi Germany are much debated, but several reasons are commonly cited:
 The way the government came to power: During the German Revolution of 1918–19, backers of a republic joined with military mutineers who refused to fight in the face of certain defeat in World War I. The stab-in-the-back myth counterfactually proposed that German could have continued fighting successfully had it not been for the surrender, but for that and other reasons, many Germans blamed the republicans for losing the war, and the new system of government did not have widespread support.
 Severe unemployment and economic problems caused by the Great Depression, war debts imposed by the Treaty of Versailles, and mismanagement that caused hyperinflation.
 Article 48 of the constitution, which gave the President the power to rule by emergency decree, a practice which was adopted as normal lawmaking broke down
 The use of proportional representation without election thresholds, which allowed small extremist parties to enter parliament and eventually come to power
 The ability of the Parliament to remove the Chancellor without assigning a replacement, which left the office vacant in 1932
 A practice of ignoring the Constitution if a law passed with a two-thirds majority, which was done in the passing of the Enabling Act of 1933, which abolished democracy
 The lack of democratic tradition and experience in lawmaking
 The actions of Heinrich Brüning in cutting social spending, and Paul von Hindenburg in appointing Adolf Hitler to be Chancellor
 The Reichstag fire establishing a pretext for an anti-Communist crackdown and abolition of civil liberties, though it is disputed as to whether it was a false flag operation

Asia

India 

The V-Dem Institute (Varieties of Democracy) claims that democratic backsliding is taking place in India under Prime Minister Narendra Modi and the ruling Bharatiya Janata Party, citing the passage of the 2019 Citizenship (Amendment) Act and the government's subsequent response to the Citizenship Amendment Act protests. It also accused the Indian government of attempting to "stifle critics in the media and academia".

Foreign policy commentator Jonah Blank has described the 2019 revocation of the special status of Jammu and Kashmir as an example of the "slow transmogrification of democracy" under the Modi government.

In 2020, the V-Dem Institute identified India as one of five severe cases of democratic backsliding, relating to disproportionate limitations being placed upon the role of the Parliament of India through measures responding to the COVID-19 pandemic. This, they asserted, may lead to an 'increased danger of power abuse by the executive'.

Indian lawyer Gautam Bhatia asserts that the Indian government has taken advantage of 'vaguely worded' legislative clauses, some of a 'colonial vintage', to effectively bypass the 'deliberative organ' (the legislative) in relation to COVID-19. Some of these laws, he further asserted, technically hold 'formal statutory backing', making it more difficult for the legislature to oppose executive power.

The Economist Intelligence Unit downgraded India from 51st place to 53rd place in their 2020 Democracy Index, citing "democratic backsliding" and "crackdowns" on civil liberties.

In its 2021 Democracy under Siege report, Freedom House downgraded India from 'free' to 'partly free', citing the response to the Citizenship Amendment Act protests.

As of their Democracy Report 2021, V-Dem lists India as an electoral autocracy, with significant downward movement to a number of indicators.  According to V-Dem, "In general, the Modi-led government in India has used laws on sedition, defamation, and counterterrorism to silence critics."

Indonesia 
There have been concerns of declining freedom of expression during the first term of the Joko Widodo administration, evidenced by the arrest, detainment, and imprisonment of many people for their social media activity being interpreted as an "insult" to the president.

On 10 June 2020, Human Rights Watch urged the Indonesian authorities to drop all charges against seven Papuan activists and students, who are on trial for their involvement in anti-racism protests last year in August. On 2 December 2019, four students along with the other 50 students, peacefully protested against the human rights abuses in Papua and West Papua, asking the Indonesian government to release the Papuan political prisoners. A civil lawsuit was filed against 4 student activists following their expulsion from their university.  On 13 July 2020, the police charged one of the four students with "treason" and "public provocation." Human Rights Watch urged the Indonesia's Khairun University to reinstate the four students who were expelled and support academic freedom and free expression.

The Ministry of Communications and Information is often criticized for its censorship, as it blocks websites "to protect its citizen from hoax". In 2020, the Director General Ministry Semuel Abrijani Pangerapan and Johnny G. Plate introduced a law that requires foreign companies to register under the Electronic System Operator list which could give the government access to the citizen's personal info and threaten the company to block access from the country if the company did not register. The law was revised and passed in 2021.  In July 2022, a ban was implemented for several notable websites such as PayPal, Epic Games, Steam, Origin, and Yahoo, and games such as Counter-Strike: Global Offensive and Dota 2 as they did not register under the ministry's new law.

After People's Representative Council approved a revision of Indonesia's criminal code on 6 December 2022, academician of Mulawarman University, Hardiansyah Hamzah stated that Indonesia is currently autocratizing and blamed the government for being "blind and deaf with public criticism".

Israel 

A number of scholars and commentators have identified Israel in the late 2010s under the premiership of Prime Minister Benjamin Netanyahu as facing a crisis of liberal democracy and a risk of right-wing populism-fueled democratic decline, undermining its traditional status as a democratic state.

Israeli legal scholar Aeyal Gross wrote that while Netanyahu's early premiership embraced a U.S.-style neoconservative approach, his later tenure "increasingly resembled the model of right wing populism with authoritarian tendencies" in the mode of Trump, Orbán, and Bolsonaro. Yaniv Roznai of the Radzyner Law School at Interdisciplinary Center Herzliya wrote in 2018 that while Israel remained "a vibrant democracy with strong and effective judicial and democratic institutions", its liberal democracy was at risk "incremental erosion of Israel's democratic institutions through countless initiatives to prevent antigovernment criticism, to weaken the judiciary, to infringe minority rights, and to modify the democratic rules of the game." Various scholars and commentators have cited as examples of democratic risks in Israel the "rise of ethno-nationalist populism"' the passage of the Nation-State Law; the use of nativist and exclusionary rhetoric by Netanyahu and his cabinet ministers; including comments during the 2015 election campaign delegitimizing Arab Israeli voters and comments labeling opponents and left-wing critics as traitors and tools of outside forces; proposals to change Israeli law to modify the status of (or unilaterally annex) the West Bank; Netanyahu's effort to grant himself immunity from prosecution on charges of corruption; legislative proposals to limit the powers and independence of the Israeli Supreme Court, including the scope of its judicial review competence; overtly racist or fear-mongering campaign advertisements by some parties of the populist right; and efforts to exert greater control over the media and NGOs. In a 2019 report, Tamara Cofman Wittes and Yael Mizrahi-Arnaud of the Brookings Institution argue that Israeli politics has "sources of resilience" that offer "pathways away from illiberal populism" including structural features of the Israeli political system (such as norms of liberal democracy and a fragmented parliamentary system that leads to competing populist parties) and cultural features of the Israeli society (such as a burgeoning women's movement that spans "secular-religious, Ashkenazi-Mizrachi, and Jewish-Arab divides").

In 2019 and 2020, four national elections were held. The first three resulted in a tie, essentially deadlocking between pro- and anti-Netanyahu forces. The March 2021 election resulted in Netanyahu's ouster and the formation of a broad-based coalition government consisting of right-wing anti-Netanyahu parties, centrist, center-left, left-wing, and Arab parties. Scholars discussed whether the change in power would mark the end of democratic backsliding that had occurred under Netanyahu.

After the collapse of the Bennet-Lapid government, Netanyahu was inaugurated again as Prime Minister and formatted a new government which is considered to be the most far-right, ultra-nationalist, religiously conservative government in Israel’s history. Netanyahu’s government unveiled plans to weaken the judicial system, including overriding Supreme Court decisions with a simple 61 majority of the Knesset, and changing the structure of the Judicial Selection Committee by adding more politicians. The ultranationalist Itamar Ben-Gvir who was also previously convicted of supporting a terrorist group known as Kach, which espoused Kahanism and anti-Arabism was appointed Minister of National Security after changing the law giving Ben-Gvir unprecedented power over the police.

Philippines

Under the rule of President Rodrigo Duterte, the Philippines has been described as undergoing democratic backsliding.

David Timberman of the Carnegie Endowment for International Peace has argued that the Duterte government has "run roughshod over human rights, its political opponents, and the country’s democratic institutions", citing intimidation of political opponents, institutions and the media, increased extrajudicial killings, and suggestions of implementing martial law. Duterte has claimed to have looked to Vladimir Putin and Donald Trump as a role model to do more democratic backsliding.

During his term, Duterte threatened the shutdown of Philippine's largest TV network ABS-CBN. On 5 May 2020 the network met its fate when the National Telecommunications Commission issued a cease and desist order against to the network due to its expired franchise. Duterte also told the media that he would not sign the network's franchise even if the Congress of the Philippines agrees to renew the franchise of the TV network.

Singapore 
According to a 2020 study, it claimed that Singapore experienced some democratic backsliding after the 2015 general election.

Turkey 

Turkey under Recep Tayyip Erdoğan has experienced democratic backsliding. Scholar Ozan Varol writes that Erdoğan engaged in a form of "stealth authoritarianism" that incrementally increased pressure on democratic institutions over time and eventually culminated in authoritarianism. Although Erdoğan was originally viewed as a possible reformer, the Turkish government took a sharp authoritarian turn when it violently suppressed the Gezi Park protests in May 2013. Increasing curbs on freedom of the press, freedom of expression, and freedom of assembly coincided with Erdoğan's purge of liberal and conciliatory figures from the Justice and Development Party (AKP). A constitutional referendum in October 2007 changed the method of selection of the President of Turkey from election by the Grand National Assembly to direct election, marking a shift to a presidential system. Erdoğan consolidated executives power through his re-election in 2014 and his subsequent dismissal of Ahmet Davutoğlu. Following a failed coup attempt in 2016 (which Erdoğan blamed on the Hizmet movement of his former ally-turned-rival, Fethullah Gülen), Erdoğan declared a state of emergency; undertook a series of major purges targeting civil society and perceived political opponents, including those within the bureaucracy, police, judiciary, and academia, and prosecutors; and dismantled the rule of law. A 2017 constitutional referendum formally adopted a presidential system and further aggrandized executive power. The effect of the shifts, partly enabled by a weak and internally divided Turkish opposition, was to transform Turkey into a hybrid regime. In its 2018 annual report, Freedom House classified Turkey as "not free" (the first time the country has been classified as such by Freedom House, which began publishing annual reports in 1999). A 2019 report from the European Commission identified Turkey as "seriously backsliding" on areas of human rights, the rule of law and economic policy.

A contrary view holds that Turkey was never a democracy to begin with.

Africa
Various countries in Africa have experienced democratic backsliding. Christopher Fomunyoh, a longtime Africa expert with the U.S.-based National Democratic Institute, said in 2020 testimony to the U.S. House of Representatives' Foreign Affairs Subcommittee on Africa, Global Health and Global Human Rights that there were strong democratic advances in Africa (especially West Africa) occurred between the late 1980s to the late 2010s, but that by 2019, democratic trends had reversed, with the result being "there are now fewer democracies in Africa" in 2021 than in 1991. Fomunyoh noted that in the first 20 years of the 21st century, about a dozen countries in sub-Saharan Africa weakened or abolished constitutional term limits for presidents; these moves weakened constitutionalism to benefit incumbents, removed one method of facilitating "the peaceful and orderly renewal of political leadership" and led to "excessive fragmentation and polarization of the polity, and, in some cases outright violence, and the further shrinking of political space."

Tanzania has experienced democratic backsliding since 2016, and Ethiopia since 2018. Other examples of democratic backsliding in Africa in the 2010s and 2020s include the coups in Mali in 2020 and 2021 and persecution of dissidents and civil society activists in Zimbabwe.

Mauritius 
Mauritius has experienced moderate democratic backsliding during the 2019 general election as well as thereafter during the COVID-19 pandemic. The V-Dem institute deemed Mauritius to be a major autocratizer in its 2021 Democracy report.

In the recent aftermath following the 2019 general elections in Mauritius, anomalies were reported by the local press. Examples of electoral irregularities include eligible voters absent from the registration rolls, unauthorized technology in polling centers, as well as strewn and misplaced marked ballots.

In the midst of the COVID-19 pandemic, the government under Prime Minister Pravind Jugnauth made numerous amendments to existing laws that could jeopardize accountability and transparency in parliament. The suspension of parliamentary sessions, ejection of members of the opposition party (including its leader) and the perceived bias of the parliamentary speaker increased in regularity during that time. In June 2020, the Vice Prime Minister Ivan Collendavelloo was removed from office over allegations of corruption in the St Louis Gate scandal. The former attorney general Jayarama Valayden, who is often a voice of dissent against the serving government, was arrested in 2021 for organizing a rally which violated COVID-19 rules on public gatherings. In reaction to unarmed protests against the government's handling of the Wakashio oil spill off the island's coast, the government dispatched an armed police force to deter public assembly.

In reaction to the Independent Broadcasting Authority Bill, worries over the erosion of the freedom of expression and journalistic freedom were voiced. The bill would enshrine in law the ability of judges to force journalists to divulge their sources. Simultaneously, prohibitive fines would be imposed on journalists as well as shortening media licensing from three years to one year while doubling its cost. Mauritius' Information and Communications Technologies Act (ICTA) also sparked controversy for its provision to tap into secure messages, facilitate arrest and imprisonment over online posts and messages deemed defamatory.

Tunisia 

After democratizing in 2011 Tunisia was a competitive democracy for ten years, before president Kais Saied faced protests against him and suspended the parliament in 2021, changing the constitution in 2022.

English-speaking world

United Kingdom

Human Rights Watch has accused the government of Boris Johnson of democratic backsliding, citing the illegal suspension of Parliament during the Brexit negotiations to prevent scrutiny, its appointments to important Parliamentary committees, and the Parliament of the United Kingdom being cut out of the rule-making process during the COVID-19 pandemic, alongside the government attempting to water down the powers of independent courts and having "pilloried" the legal profession, pushing for "de facto immunity for torture and war crimes committed by British troops overseas", and attempting to restrict the access of certain media outlets to press briefings. The Constitution Unit of University College London also released articles warning of democratic backsliding after Johnson's government unveiled new bills in the 2021 State Opening of Parliament, some of which were passed into law. For example, the Police, Crime, Sentencing and Courts bill (passed into law on 28 April 2022) has been criticized for restricting the right to protest. Johnson resigned after the Partygate scandal, although his Conservative Party remains in power in government.

United States

Political scientists have identified democratic backsliding in the United States in decades up to the 2020s.

Political scientists have credited Newt Gingrich with playing a key role in undermining democratic norms in the United States and hastening political polarization and partisanship as the 50th Speaker of the United States House of Representatives from 1995 to 1999.

The presidential candidacy and presidency of Donald Trump prompted grave concerns among political scientists regarding accelerated democratic backsliding in the United States. In a 2019 journal article, political scientists Robert C. Lieberman, Suzanne Mettler, and others wrote that Trump's presidency presented a threat to the American democratic order because it simultaneously brought together three specific trends—"polarized two-party presidentialism; a polity fundamentally divided over membership and status in the political community, in ways structured by race and economic inequality; and the erosion of democratic norms"—for the first time in American history. Lieberman noted that Donald Trump has "repeatedly challenged the very legitimacy of the basic mechanics and norms of the American electoral process, invoking the specter of mass voter fraud, encouraging voter suppression, selectively attacking the Electoral College, and even threatening to disrupt the peaceful transfer of power" and noted that "Never in the modern era has a presidential candidate threatened to lock up his opponent; castigated people so publicly and repeatedly on the basis of their country of origin, religion, sex, disability, or military service record; or operated with no evident regard for facts or truth." In 2020, political scientists Alexander Cooley and Daniel Nexon, wrote that "the Trump administration has consistently de-emphasized the importance of human rights and democracy in its rhetoric and  while adopting language and tropes similar to those of right-wing, illiberal movements." Colley and Nexon cited Trump's praise of autocratic rulers, his echoing of ethno-nationalist rhetoric, his efforts to delegitimize journalism and journalists as "fake news" and his policies erecting new barriers to refugees and asylum-seekers as similar to politics "found in backsliding regimes".

Political scientist Pippa Norris wrote in 2021 that democratic backsliding under Trump culminated in his attempts to undermine the peaceful transfer of power and overturn the results of the 2020 presidential election, in which Trump was defeated by Joe Biden; Trump incited an insurrection at the Capitol in January 2021, which briefly interrupted Congress's counting of the electoral votes, which formalized Trump's loss and the victory of the incoming president.

The 2019 annual democracy report of the V-Dem Institute at the University of Gothenburg found that the U.S. under Trump was among the world's liberal democracies experiencing "democratic erosion" (but not full-scale "democratic breakdown"). The report cited an increase in "polarization of society and disrespect in public deliberations" as well as Trump's attacks on the media and opposition and attempts to contain the judiciary and the legislature. The report concluded, however, that "American institutions appear to be withstanding these attempts to a significant degree", noting that Democrats had won a majority the House of Representatives in the 2018 midterm elections, which "seems to have reversed the trajectory of an increasingly unconstrained executive". The V-Dem Institute's 2020 report found that the U.S. had "registered a substantial decline in liberal democracy" under Trump; the report also found that "the United States of America is the only country in Western Europe and North America suffering from substantial autocratization."

According to a 2020 study in the American Political Science Review, Americans value democracy but are frequently willing to prioritize partisan political gains over democracy if the two are in conflict. Scholars have identified U.S. federalism, the urban-rural divide, and the emergence of white identity politics as key drivers behind democratic backsliding in the U.S.

In 2021 a Freedom House report rated the U.S. 83 out of 100, an 11-point drop from its rating of 94 out of 100 in 2011. Issues such as institutional racism in the United States in relation to criminal justice and voting rights, the negative influence of campaign finance which Freedom House views is damaging public trust in government, and increased political polarization in the United States due to the extreme use of partisan gerrymandering were cited as reasons for the decline in the United States' rating.

In 2021 the International Institute for Democracy and Electoral Assistance added the United States to their list of backsliding democracies, pointing to Trump's attempts to overturn the results of the 2020 election, as well as state voting laws that disproportionately impact minority groups.

Latin America

Bolivia

Former President Evo Morales was described by Oliver Stuenkel of the Carnegie Endowment for International Peace as leading a "slow erosion of democracy" in Bolivia, claiming that Morales was "exerting tighter control over the judiciary and the opposition media".

The 2019 Bolivian political crisis, when the Bolivian Armed Forces compelled President Morales to resign, was described by Javier Corrales as "one of the few examples of democratic backsliding in which the government ends defeated". However, other analysts, such as Robert Carlson, have noted that acting President Jeanine Áñez "repeatedly delayed elections after a tumultuous transfer of power", describing this an example of pandemic-era democratic backsliding. Áñez and her ministers were later jailed on terrorism and sedition charges, which she described as a "political prosecution", with Human Rights Watch noting the arrest warrants "contain no evidence whatsoever that they have committed the crime of terrorism".

Brazil

Political scientist Robert Muggah argued in Foreign Policy that Brazil was undergoing backsliding under President Jair Bolsonaro, noting Bolsonaro's criticisms of the judiciary and the electoral system, and his participation in anti-democratic rallies. Bolsonaro has often used Rodrigo Duterte and Donald Trump as a model to effect democratic backsliding in Brazil.

In July 2021, Bolsonaro threatened to cancel the 2022 Brazilian general election, claiming election fraud would take place unless the electoral system was reformed.

In August 2021, Bolsonaro described "three alternatives for [his] future", which he said were "being arrested, killed or victory" in the 2022 election.

Following his defeat in the 2022 election, Bolsonaro declined to concede, although he allowed a transition to take place to incoming President Lula da Silva. The 2023 Brazilian Congress attack which followed was described as an instance of democratic backsliding.

El Salvador

El Salvador has been described as undergoing democratic backsliding after the election of President Nayib Bukele, particularly following the 2020 crisis, when Bukele sent Salvadoran Army soldiers into the Legislative Assembly to pressure and intimidate members of the Assembly. In a June 2020 report, the V-Dem Institute wrote that El Salvador was "at high risk of pandemic backsliding" and that the country was one of several countries with "severe" violations of democratic standards of emergency measures, including: arbitrary mass arrests by security forces of persons deemed to violate social distancing rules (in contravention of a number of decisions of the Supreme Court).

In May 2021, supporters of Bukele in the Legislative Assembly dismissed El Salvador's judges of the Supreme Court and the Attorney General. The Organization of American States condemned the dismissals, declaring that they were undermining democratic principles.

In September 2021, Bukele-appointed judges ruled that Bukele could run for a second term, despite El Salvador's constitutional prohibition on serving two consecutive terms in office.

The U.S. chargé d’ affaires ad interim to El Salvador, Jean Elizabeth Manes, has said that the actions of the Bukele government have led to deteriorating relations with the United States, stating, "We simply can’t look away when there’s a decline in democracy".

In September 2022, Chilean President Gabriel Boric described an "authoritarian drift" in El Salvador which he warned was "undermining democracy" in the name of fighting crime.

Guatemala
Attempts by President Jimmy Morales to end the United Nations International Commission against Impunity in Guatemala have been described by Sanne Weber as having "raised serious doubts about democracy in the Central American country".

In May 2022, the United States government banned Guatemalan Attorney General María Consuelo Porras from the entering the U.S., with U.S. Secretary of State Antony Blinken stating, "Attorney General Porras’s corrupt acts undermine democracy in Guatemala".

The Los Angeles Times has reported that there is "a growing wave of attacks on Guatemala’s courts that have forced more than 20 judges and prosecutors into exile", with political analyst Edgar Gutiérrez accusing the Guatemalan government under President Alejandro Giammattei of "constructing an authoritarian state".

Honduras
The Organization of American States (OAS) was critical of the conduct of the 2017 Honduran general election, noting irregularities in its conduct and calling for fresh elections. Following a decision by the Supreme Electoral Tribunal, the election was won by President Juan Orlando Hernández, who had run for a second term following the Honduran Supreme Court's decision to allow the President of the country to run for re-election. The tenure of Hernández and the National Party of Honduras has been described by Patricio Navia and Lucas Perelló as a period of democratic backsliding, with Perelló claiming that Hernández and the National Party of Honduras had "dismantled democratic institutions" in Honduras. Hernández has also been accused of "human rights violations" and "extrajudicial killings".

Hernández also pursued close ties with Nicaraguan President Daniel Ortega, despite ideological differences between the right-wing Hernández and left-wing Ortega, opposing or abstaining on resolutions condemning Nicaraguan actions at the OAS.

Hernández subsequently followed constitutional term limits and chose not to run for a third term, and the National Party lost the 2021 Honduran general election.

Nicaragua
Nicaragua under President Daniel Ortega has been described by Lucas Perelló and Patricio Navia as undergoing democratic backsliding, leading Ortega's Sandinista National Liberation Front to have a "dominant status" in the country's politics. Ortega has enacted changes that have reduced the capacity for Nicaraguans to make claims against the government.

After rising to power, Ortega ratified indefinite elections in 2014 that have now allowed Ortega to serve on his fourth consecutive term. Although opposition parties rival him, Ortega has concentrated power by hosting elections that many deem as fraudulent and banning opposition party leaders from standing by the Nicaragua Supreme Court. Following Ortega's 2021 election, the United States, Canada, and the United Kingdom imposed sanctions on Nicaragua over the fraudulent election.

Ortega has cracked down on civil society, where he motivated the military to use lethal violence on protestors in April 2018. Prior to the 2021 Nicaraguan general election, Nicaragua jailed opposition figures and journalists under a new treason law. In 2022, Ortega has intensified a crackdown on the Catholic Church by banning processions, arresting priests, and shutting down Catholic radio stations.

Venezuela

Since the late 1990s, Venezuela has undergone a significant backslide in democratic institutions. Chavismo propelled democratic backsliding in Venezuela.

From 1958 onward, Venezuela was considered to be a relatively stable democracy within a continent that was facing a wave of military dictatorship, consuming almost all Latin American countries in the 1970s. Until the early 1980s, it was one of Latin America's four most prosperous states; with an upper-middle economy, and a stable centre-left democracy. The collapse of the oil market in the 1980s left Venezuela (a major crude oil exporter) in great debt.

In the 1990s, during the second term of Carlos Andrés Pérez and the term of his successor Rafael Caldera, the country implemented market-oriented strategies in order to receive monetary aid from the International Monetary Fund, cuts spending on social programs, and eliminated price controls on consumer goods and gas, which caused social unrest and high inflation. Hugo Chávez won the presidency in December 1998 by appealing on the desires of the poor and pledging economic reforms, and, once in office, securing his power by creating an authoritarian regime, following a relatively stable pattern between 1999 and 2003. Chávez started rewriting the constitution swiftly after arriving in-office. After enabling himself to legally rewrite the constitution and therewith amending a presidential term from five to six years, with a single reelection, Chávez gained full control over the military branch. This allowed him to determine military promotions, and eliminate the Senate. As a result, he no longer required legislative approval. The weakening of political institutions and increased government corruption transformed Venezuela into a personal dictatorship.

Chavez's dominance of the media (including a constant presence on television) and his charismatic personality contributed to democratic backsliding in Venezuela, in addition to constitutional revisions that concentrated Chávez's power and diminished the executive's accountability.

A rapid increase in crude oil prices around 2003 fueled economic growth in the country, allowing Chávez and his party to further entrench their dominance. By 2004, Chávez had gained full authority over the democracy-sustaining institutions, diminishing checks and balances and the power of the National Assembly. Accusing traditional parties of causing the initial economic distress through exploitation of the country, he justified the weakening of non-executive branches by arguing that those branches were dominated by the traditional parties, and therefore unreliable. After Chávez' death in 2013, his successor Nicolás Maduro continued an authoritarian style of governance. After the Venezuelan opposition won a majority of the National Assembly in the 2015 elections, Maduro and his allies retained control of the other key levers of power, including the military, state-run oil company, Supreme Court, and National Electoral Council. In 2017, Maduro and his allies, moved to circumvent the opposition-controlled National Assembly by creating a Constituent National Assembly, dominated by government loyalists, and declaring it the supreme organ of state power. This move further intensified Venezuela's democratic backsliding. Currently, Venezuela is an authoritarian regime, and had even been described as a personal dictatorship.

References

Democracy by location
Democratic backsliding